Cossimbazar is a railway station of the Sealdah-Lalgola line in the Eastern Railway zone of Indian Railways. The station is situated at Cossimbazar in northern part of  Baharampur in Murshidabad district in the Indian state of West Bengal. It serves northern part of Baharampur.

Electrification
The Krishnanagar– section, including Cossimbazar railway station was electrified in 2004. In 2010 the line became double tracked.

References

Railway stations in Murshidabad district
Sealdah railway division
Kolkata Suburban Railway stations